SM U-62 was one of the 329 submarines serving in the Imperial German Navy in World War I.
U-62 was engaged in the naval warfare and took part in the First Battle of the Atlantic.

On 8 March 1917, SM U-62 sank the coal freighter , the ship that had rammed and sunk the  ocean liner in one of the deadliest peacetime maritime disasters in modern history.

On 7 August 1918, she torpedoed the French armoured cruiser Dupetit-Thouars, which sank with the loss of 13 of her crew.

Summary of raiding history

References

Notes

Citations

Bibliography

World War I submarines of Germany
1916 ships
U-boats commissioned in 1916
Ships built in Bremen (state)
Type U 57 submarines